Red Haw is an unincorporated community in Ashland County, in the U.S. state of Ohio.

History
A former variant name of Red Haw was Lafayette. Lafayette was laid out in 1835. A post office called Red Haw was established in 1867, and remained in operation until 1904.

References

Unincorporated communities in Ashland County, Ohio
1835 establishments in Ohio
Populated places established in 1835
Unincorporated communities in Ohio